lyme & cybelle was an American male-female folk-pop duo formed by Warren Zevon and Violet Santangelo. The duo is best known for its moderate chart hit "Follow Me", which represented the first commercial recording of Zevon's long musical career.

Origins
Zevon and Santangelo met in early 1964 while attending Fairfax High School in Los Angeles, California.  The two became close platonic friends and quickly found they shared musical interests, singing songs by The Beatles.  They soon formed a musical partnership.  Zevon took the stage name of Stephen lyme, while Santangelo called herself cybelle, a name inspired by the 1962 French film Sundays and Cybele.  The pair fashioned their names in lower case in the style of American poet e.e. cummings.

On one occasion, the duo sang songs for a group of friends that included child actor Michael Burns, whose mother worked at White Whale Records.  Through this connection, Zevon and Santangelo obtained a contract with White Whale to record a single as lyme and cybelle.

Early success and rapid decline
Bones Howe produced their first single for White Whale, called "Follow Me."  Howe, famed for his production work on hits by The Association and The 5th Dimension, later considered "Follow Me" to be the first psychedelic pop record. The single, backed with the lush ballad "Like the Seasons," reached number 65 on the Billboard pop charts in April 1966.

Rather than having the duo record an album to cash in on its success, White Whale opted to have Howe produce a second lyme and cybelle single. The resulting single, a cover of Bob Dylan's "If You Gotta Go, Go Now" backed with "I'll Go On," failed to make a dent in the charts. According to Santangelo, the single began selling well, only to have its momentum crushed when Bill Gavin, a powerful radio industry figure, claimed the song was sexually suggestive.

After the failure of their second single, Zevon left the duo. Several reasons have been given for why Zevon departed. Some accounts claim that Zevon became more uncompromising in his artistic vision. Santangelo claims that she walked away from Zevon because of his excessive drinking and drug use.

Zevon was replaced by a new "lyme," Monkees guitarist Wayne Erwin.  The first and only single issued by the second version of lyme and cybelle was "Song 7," backed with "Write If You Get Work," both allegedly written by Erwin, although credited to "Joe Glenn."  The single was produced by Curt Boettcher, who had just produced The Association's first album. This incarnation of lyme and cybelle lasted into 1967, when Erwin fired Santangelo.

After lyme and cybelle
Following the demise of lyme and cybelle, Santangelo left the music business. Trying her hand at musical theater, she earned a talent scholarship at the University of Southern California. She became a successful Broadway actress under the stage name Laura Kenyon.

Zevon's subsequent demo recordings indicated an evolution toward incisive and darkly humorous lyrics and a rough sound far removed from the mellow vibe of lyme and cybelle. He scored a couple of songwriting successes: "Outside Chance" was covered by The Turtles, while "She Quit Me" was included on the soundtrack from the 1969 drama film Midnight Cowboy. Zevon's first solo album, Wanted Dead or Alive, was released by Imperial Records in 1970. Although that album was not a commercial success, Zevon would eventually rise to fame with his classic albums Warren Zevon (1976) and Excitable Boy (1978).

The Turtles recorded a cover of lyme and cybelle's "Like the Seasons" as a B-side to their #1 hit from 1967, "Happy Together."

Re-release
All six of the lyme and cybelle songs from their three singles were included on a compilation album entitled The First Sessions, released by Varèse Sarabande in early 2003, shortly after Zevon was diagnosed with fatal mesothelioma. This compilation also included two previously unreleased lyme and cybelle recordings, "I've Just Seen a Face" by the Beatles and "Peeping And Hiding" by Jimmy Reed, plus a demo recording of "Follow Me."

Discography

References

Warren Zevon
American musical duos
Folk music duos
Male–female musical duos
Musical groups established in 1964
Musical groups disestablished in 1967
Musicians from Los Angeles
American folk musical groups
American pop rock music groups
White Whale Records artists